Xidirsha is an urban-type settlement in Andijan Region of Uzbekistan. It is part of the Xoʻjaobod District. Its population is 5,300 (2016).

References

Populated places in Andijan Region
Urban-type settlements in Uzbekistan